The 2019 South American Trampoline Championships were held in Paipa, Colombia, from September 3 to 9, 2019. The competition was organized by the Colombian Gymnastics Federation, and approved by the International Gymnastics Federation.

Medalists

References

2019 in gymnastics
Trampoline,2019
International gymnastics competitions hosted by Colombia
2019 in Colombian sport